Sokolki Parish is an administrative unit of Rēzekne Municipality in the Latgale region of Latvia. The administrative center is Strupļi.

Towns, villages and settlements of Sokolki Parish 
 Skudnovka
 Strupļi
 Ustroņi

Parishes of Latvia
Rēzekne Municipality
Latgale